Tulpius  is a spider genus of the jumping spider family, Salticidae.

Species
 Tulpius gauchus Bauab & Soares, 1983 — Brazil
 Tulpius hilarus Peckham & Peckham, 1896 — Guatemala

External links
 Painting of T. hilarus

Salticidae
Spiders of Central America
Spiders of South America
Salticidae genera